Bolesław Bronisław Duch (1885–1980) was a Polish Major General and General Inspector of the Armed Forces.

Life
Duch served during World War I, 1914–18, in the Polish Legions. After Poland regained independence, he served in the Polish Army.  In 1935-1938 he commanded the 73rd Infantry Regiment. At the outbreak of World War II, the commander of the 39th Reserve Infantry Division General Bruno Olbrycht was ill and the division was de facto commanded by Duch.

After Poland was overrun by Germany and the Soviet Union in September 1939, Duch managed to evade capture and served in western Europe, becoming commander successively of the Polish 1st Grenadier Division in France (1940), 1st Rifle Brigade of the 1st Polish Corps in Scotland (1942–43), and of the 3rd Carpathian Infantry Division of the 2nd Polish Corps (1943–46).

In 1947, Duch settled in London and became chairman of the Council of the World Polish Veterans' Association. He was the last General Inspector of the Armed Forces (from February 1980 until his death in October that year).

Promotions
 1914: Lieutenant
 1919: First Lieutenant
 1919: Captain
 1924: Major
 1929: Lieutenant Colonel
 1938: Colonel
 1940: Brigadier
 1945: Major General

Decorations

 Knight's Cross of the Virtuti Militari (1 June 1945), Gold Cross (1940) and Silver Cross
 Commander's Cross with Star of the Polonia Restituta
 Cross of Merit (Poland), with Swords
 Cross of Valour (Poland), 8 times
 Cross of Independence
 Gold Cross of Merit with Swords
 Gold Cross of Merit
 Croix de Guerre
 Military Cross
 Medal Międzysojuszniczy "Medaille Interalliée"
Commandeur dans l'ordre de la Légion d'honneur  ( décoré par le général Valentin Gouverneur Militaire de Metz en 1948 dans une caserne de Phalsbourg) Source: Roger Bruge "Les combattants du 18 Juin".

See also
List of Poles

References

1885 births
1980 deaths
People from Ternopil Oblast
Polish generals
Knights of the Virtuti Militari
Commanders with Star of the Order of Polonia Restituta
Recipients of the Cross of Independence
Recipients of the Gold Cross of Merit (Poland)
Recipients of the Cross of Merit with Swords (Poland)
Recipients of the Cross of Valour (Poland)
Recipients of the Military Cross